Curling Québec is the regional governing body for the sport of curling in Quebec. It was founded in 1976 and is one of Curling Canada's 14 member associations.

Provincial championships 
Curling Québec hosts nine provincial championships annually:

 WFG Tankard (Men's)
 Quebec Scotties Tournament of Hearts (Women's)
 Mixed Doubles
 Mixed
 Masters Men's
 Masters Women's
 Wheelchair
 Senior Men's
 Senior Women's

See also 

 List of curling clubs in Quebec

References

External links 

 Official website

Curling governing bodies in Canada
Sports governing bodies in Quebec
Curling in Quebec